"You've Been in Love Too Long" is a song produced and written by William "Mickey" Stevenson, Ivy Jo Hunter and Clarence Paul.  It was released dance single when recorded by Motown girl group Martha and the Vandellas.

Background
The song was the trio's  fourth straight Top 40 hit in two years, and focused on a pro-feminist theme under a gritty R&B background with the narrator (lead singer Martha Reeves) explaining to the woman in question that after years of holding on to an unfaithful and abusive lover that she should let him go saying "you're a fool for your baby". Many radio jocks preferred the "B" side, "Love (Makes Me Do Foolish Things)" in which caused split airplay and lower chart positioning.

Cash Box described it as a "rollicking, rhythmic pop-r&b item about a twosome who have been together a wee bit too long."

Chart performance
In the US, "You've Been in Love Too Long" went to #25 on the Top Selling Rhythm & Blues Singles chart, and #36 on the Hot 100.

References

1965 songs
1965 singles
Martha and the Vandellas songs
Songs written by Clarence Paul
Songs written by Ivy Jo Hunter
Songs written by William "Mickey" Stevenson
Gordy Records singles